Russian submarine K-173 Krasnoyarsk  was an   which was commissioned on 31 December 1986, and entered service with the Russian Navy. Krasnoyarsk has been removed from active service.

On 29 April 2016, the boat caught fire whilst being scrapped at Vilyuchinsk and was scuttled to extinguish the fire.

References

Submarines of the Soviet Navy
Oscar-class submarines
Ships built in Russia
1986 ships
Maritime incidents in 2016